Achaneyanenikkishtam is a 2001 Indian Malayalam-language family drama film directed by Suresh Krishnan, written by Suresh Poduval and produced by Menaka. It features Ashwin Thampi, Kalabhavan Mani, Biju Menon, and Lakshmi Gopalaswamy in the lead roles, and Mohanlal appears in a guest role. The film was released on 30 November 2001. It won the Kerala State Film Award for Best Music Director for M. G. Radhakrishnan.

Plot

The story is about a poor lorry driver named Bhaskaran (Kalabhavani Mani), who tries to give his son Kunjunni (Ashwin Thampi), a good education by sending him to a very expensive school. The rest of the story revolves around the events Kunjunni goes through in his life.

Cast
Kalabhavan Mani as Bhaskaran
Biju Menon as Anand
Lakshmi Gopalaswamy as Seetha Nair
Jagathy Sreekumar as Nalinakshan
Ashwin Thampi as Kunjunni
Nandhu as Kariyachan
Devan as Andrews Issac
Sujitha as Sofia
T. P. Madhavan as Nambeeshan
Poojappura Ravi as Chettiyar
Vinu Chakravarthy as Kovai Neelakandan
Kochu Preman as Kurup Mash
Sreekala Thaha
Keerthy Suresh as Kunjunni's classmate
Mohanlal as Mahadevan (Cameo appearance)

Soundtrack 
The film's soundtrack contains 9 songs, all composed by M. G. Radhakrishnan, with lyrics by S. Ramesan Nair. 'Shalabham Vazhimaaruma' is in the Darbari Kanada raga.

Awards
The film won the Kerala State Film Award for Best Music Director for M. G. Radhakrishnan.

References

External links
 

2001 films
2000s Malayalam-language films
Films scored by M. G. Radhakrishnan
Films scored by Sharreth